Cliff van Blerk (30 December 1938 – 7 June 2018) was an Australian football (soccer) player. He is the father of former footballer Jason van Blerk; they were the third father-son combination to play for the Australian national football team.

References

1938 births
2018 deaths
People from New South Wales
Australian soccer players
Australia international soccer players
Australian people of Dutch descent
Association football defenders